Prion pruritus is the intense itching during the prodromal period of the Creutzfeldt–Jakob disease.

See also
 Pruritus

References

Pruritic skin conditions